Nikola Milanković (born 24 April 1986) is a former Serbian football midfielder.

Career
He started his career in Proleter Novi Sad. After 4 seasons, he moved in Zlatibor Voda Horgoš and than to Spartak Subotica, where he affirmed as a footballer. Later, he left to Kazakhstan, and stayed there for two seasons.

In 2014, he returned in Serbia, and signed with Napredak Kruševac.

At the end of the 2013/14 season Milankovic joined Borussia Fulda.

References

External links
 
 Nikola Milanković footballtop.com
 Nikola Milanković  Player Profile au.eurosport.com
 
 Stats at utakmica.rs 

1986 births
Living people
Footballers from Split, Croatia
Association football midfielders
Serbian footballers
Serbian expatriate footballers
FK Proleter Novi Sad players
FK Spartak Subotica players
FC Atyrau players
FK Napredak Kruševac players
Borussia Fulda players
Serbian SuperLiga players
Kazakhstan Premier League players
Expatriate footballers in Kazakhstan
Expatriate footballers in Germany